This is a list of airports in Algeria, grouped by type and sorted by location.

Algeria, officially known as the People's Democratic Republic of Algeria, is a country located in North Africa. It is the largest country on the Mediterranean Sea, and the African continent, as well as the tenth-largest country in the world in terms of land area. It is bordered by Tunisia in the northeast, Libya in the east, Niger in the southeast, Mali and Mauritania in the southwest, a few kilometers of the Moroccan-controlled Western Sahara in the southwest, Morocco in the west and northwest, and the Mediterranean Sea in the north. Algeria is divided into 58 provinces (wilayas), 553 districts (daïras) and 1,541 communes or municipalities.



Airports 

Airport names shown in bold indicate the airport has scheduled service on commercial airlines.

Usage statistics 
This table shows the passengers and freight of airports in Algeria in 2008.

See also 

 Transport in Algeria
 Algerian Air Force
 List of airports by ICAO code: D#DA - Algeria
 Wikipedia: WikiProject Aviation/Airline destination lists: Africa#Algeria

References

External links 
 Service d'Information Aéronautique - Algerie 
 Aeronautical Information Publication and Aerodrome Charts
 
  - includes IATA codes
 Great Circle Mapper: Airports in Algeria - IATA and ICAO codes, coordinates
 World Aero Data: Airports in Algeria - ICAO codes, coordinates

airports
Algeria
Airports
Algeria